Erick Brooks may refer to:

 E-Swift (Erick Brooks), American hip hop DJ
 Eric Brooks, also known as Blade, a Marvel Comics superhero
 Blade (New Line Blade franchise character)

See also
 Eric Brook (1907–1965), English footballer
 Eric Brookes (1894–1918), British flying ace
 Erik Brooks, founder of Ethos Capital